Little Pigeon River is the name of several rivers in the United States:

Little Pigeon River (Cheboygan County)
Little Pigeon River (Indiana)
Little Pigeon River (Michigan)
Little Pigeon River (Mullett Lake)
Little Pigeon River (Tennessee)

See also 
 Pigeon River (disambiguation)